In geometry, a decahedron is a polyhedron with ten faces. There are 32300 topologically distinct decahedra, and none are regular, so this name does not identify a specific type of polyhedron except for the number of faces.

Some decahedra have regular faces:

 Octagonal prism (uniform 8-prism)
 Square antiprism (uniform 4-antiprism)
 Square cupola (Johnson solid 4)
 Pentagonal bipyramid (Johnson solid 13, 5-bipyramid)
 Augmented pentagonal prism (Johnson solid 52)

The decahedra with irregular faces include:

 Pentagonal trapezohedron (5-trapezohedron, antiprism dual) often used as a die in role playing games, known as d10
 Enneagonal pyramid (9-pyramid)
 Ten of diamonds decahedron - a space-filling polyhedron with D2d symmetry.

References

External links
 

Polyhedra